Dominik Lakatoš (born 8 April 1997) is a Czech professional ice hockey player. He is currently playing for HC Vítkovice of the Czech Extraliga (ELH). He was selected by the New York Rangers in the sixth round, 157th overall, of the 2017 NHL Entry Draft.

Playing career
Lakatoš made his Czech Extraliga debut playing with HC Bílí Tygři Liberec during the 2014–15 Czech Extraliga season.

In the 2018–19 season, Lakatoš was unable to reproduce his previous offensive output with Liberec before he was loaned to fellow ELH club, PSG Berani Zlín, for the remainder of the campaign on 14 November 2018. In his stint with Zlín, Lakatoš regained his scoring touch to compile 4 goals and 13 points in 20 games before he was recalled from his loan by Liberec prior to the ELH trade deadline on 31 January 2019.

On 7 May 2019, Lakatoš left Liberec to sign a two-year contract with fellow ELH club, HC Vítkovice.

Career statistics

Regular season and playoffs

International

Personal life
He is of Roma (Gypsy) origin.

References

External links

1997 births
Living people
HC Bílí Tygři Liberec players
Czech ice hockey forwards
Czech Romani people
Romani sportspeople
Czech people of Romani descent
PSG Berani Zlín players
New York Rangers draft picks
Sportspeople from Liberec
HC Vítkovice players
Czech expatriate ice hockey players in Finland